Biophytum is a genus of about 50 species of annual and perennial herbaceous plants in the family Oxalidaceae. It is found in tropical and subtropical areas worldwide.  The annual Biophytum sensitivum is a traditional medicine in Nepal.  Biophytum petersianum (also known as Biophytum umbraculum) is a medicinal plant in Mali.

Species include:
 Biophytum abyssinicum – Steud ex A.Rich.
 Biophytum adiantoides – Wight ex Edgew. & Hook.f.
 Biophytum aeschynomenifolia – Guillaumin
 Biophytum albiflorum – F.Muell.
 Biophytum albizzioides – Guillaumin
 Biophytum amazonicum – R.Knuth
 Biophytum antioquiense – Knuth
 Biophytum apodiscias – Edgew. & Hook.f.
 Biophytum bequaertii – De Wild.
 Biophytum bogoroense – De Wild.
 Biophytum bolivianum – R.Knuth
 Biophytum boussingaultii – Klotzsch ex R.Knuth
 Biophytum calophyllum – Guillaumin
 Biophytum candolleanum – Wight
 Biophytum cardonaei – Pittier
 Biophytum casiquiarense – Knuth
 Biophytum castum – R.Knuth
 Biophytum chocoense – Knuth
 Biophytum columbianum – Knuth
 Biophytum commersonii – Guillaumin
 Biophytum congestiflorum – Govind.
 Biophytum cowanii – T.Wendt
 Biophytum crassipes – Engl.
 Biophytum cumingianum – Edgew. & Hook.f.
 Biophytum cumingii – Klotzsch
 Biophytum dendroides – DC.
 Biophytum dormiens – Knuth
 Biophytum dusenii – Engl. ex R.Knuth
 Biophytum esquirolii – H.Lév.
 Biophytum falcifolium – Lourteig
 Biophytum ferrugineum – Rusby
 Biophytum forsythii – R.Knuth
 Biophytum foxii – Sprague
 Biophytum fruticosum – Blume
 Biophytum fruticosum var. papuanum – Veldkamp
 Biophytum globuliflorum – R.Knuth
 Biophytum gracile – R.Knuth
 Biophytum heinrichsae – R.Knuth
 Biophytum helenae – Buscal. & Muschl.
 Biophytum hermanni – Veldkamp
 Biophytum hildebrandtii – Guillaumin
 Biophytum homblei – De Wild.
 Biophytum huilense – Killip & Cuatrec.
 Biophytum incrassatum – Delhaye
 Biophytum insigne – Gamble
 Biophytum intermedium – Wight
 Biophytum jessenii – Knuth
 Biophytum juninense – R.Knuth
 Biophytum kaessneri – R.Knuth
 Biophytum kamerunense – Engl. & R.Knuth ex Engl.
 Biophytum kayae – Aymard & P.E.Berry
 Biophytum lindsaeifolium – Knuth
 Biophytum longibracteatum – Tadulingam & Cheriyan Jacob
 Biophytum longipedunculatum – Govind.
 Biophytum lourteigiae – Aymard & P.E.Berry
 Biophytum luetzelburgii – Suess.
 Biophytum macrorrhizum – R.E.Fr.
 Biophytum madurense – R.Knuth
 Biophytum mapirense – R.Knuth
 Biophytum microphyllum – Veldkamp
 Biophytum mimosoides – (A.St.-Hil.) Guillaumin
 Biophytum molle – Guillaumin
 Biophytum mucronatum – Lourteig
 Biophytum mutisii – R.Knuth
 Biophytum myriophyllum – R.Knuth
 Biophytum nervifolium – Thwaites
 Biophytum nudum – Edgew. & Hook.f.
 Biophytum nyikense – Exell
 Biophytum ottohuberi – Aymard & P.E.Berry
 Biophytum panamense – Lourteig
 Biophytum passargei – Knuth
 Biophytum pedicellatum – Delhaye
 Biophytum permultijugum – Suess.
 Biophytum perrieri – Guillaumin
 Biophytum peruvianum – R.Knuth
 Biophytum petersianum – Klotzsch
 Biophytum polyphyllum – Munro
 Biophytum poterioides – Edgew. ex Hook.f.
 Biophytum proliferum – Edgew. & Hook.f.
 Biophytum renifolium – Delhaye.
 Biophytum reinwardtii- kerala india 
 Biophytum richardsae – Exell
 Biophytum ringoetii – De Wild.
 Biophytum rotundifolium – Delhaye
 Biophytum santanderense – R.Knuth
 Biophytum sensitivum – (L.) DC.
 Biophytum sesbanioides – Edgew. ex Hook.f.
 Biophytum sessile – Wall.
 Biophytum somnians – G.Don
 Biophytum soukupii – Lourteig
 Biophytum talbotii – R.Knuth
 Biophytum tessmannii – R.Knuth
 Biophytum thorelianum – Guillaumin
 Biophytum turianiense – Kabuye
 Biophytum umbraculum – Welw.
 Biophytum uzungwaensis – Frim.-Moll.
 Biophytum veldkampii – A.E.S.Khan, E.S.S.Kumar, S.Binu & Pushp.
 Biophytum verticillatum – Wight
 Biophytum zenkeri – Guillaumin
 Biophytum zunigae – C.Nelson

References

External links

 
Oxalidales genera
Taxonomy articles created by Polbot